Michigan has a number of professional and semi-professional sports teams in various sports and leagues.

Major league teams

Michigan is home to four major-league professional sports teams, all of which play in the Detroit metropolitan area. The Pistons played at Detroit's Cobo Arena until 1978 and at the Pontiac Silverdome until 1988, when they moved into the Palace of Auburn Hills where they played for 28 years between 1988 and 2017, before moving back inside city limits to Little Caesars Arena in Detroit in 2017. The Detroit Lions played at Tiger Stadium in Detroit until 1974, then moved to the Pontiac Silverdome where they played for 27 years between 1975 and 2002, before moving to Ford Field in Detroit in 2002. The Detroit Tigers played at Tiger Stadium (formerly known as Navin Field and Briggs Stadium) from 1912 to 1999. In 2000 they moved to Comerica Park. The Red Wings played at Olympia Stadium until 1979, Joe Louis Arena from 1979 to 2017, and then to Little Caesars Arena beginning in 2017.

Other notable sports teams

Former professional teams

See also
 List of Michigan sport championships
 List of ice hockey teams in Michigan

References

Michigan
Michigan
Sports teams in Michigan
Professional sports teams